Ropica lineatithorax is a species of beetle in the family Cerambycidae. It was described by Pic in 1927.

References

lineatithorax
Beetles described in 1927